The Chemirani ensemble is a notable Persian classical music ensemble.

The group is made of Chemirani family:
Bijan Chemirani
Djamchid Chemirani
Keyvan Chemirani
Maryam Chemirani

In 1988, the Chemirani Trio (Bijan, Keyvan and Jamshid) was born and their special chemistry and peerless virtuosity has popularised the zarb.
Djamchid Chemirani was born in Tehran in 1942. he has studied the zarb, also called the tombak, since the age of eight. His teacher was Hossein Tehrani. Under Tehrani's demanding tutelage, Chemirani made rapid progress and soon became a brilliant player. Since his arrival in Paris in 1961 he has taught at the Centre d'Etudes de Musique Orientale in the Paris Sorbonne Institut de Musicologie. He has performed with eminent Iranian musicians Dariush Safvat, Daryush Talai and Madjid Kiani.

Born in Paris in 1968, Keyvan Chemirani started learning the zarb at the age of 13. Taught by his father, he soon assimilated the traditional technique. He studied for his masters in mathematics until 1989, when he launched an international career as soloist and accompanist.

Bijan Chemirani began studying zarb early on with his father Djamchid and his brother Keyvan. He also plays the daf, riqq, and cajon. He has issued an album, Gulistan:Rose Garden along with Ross Daly.

Since their inception as rhythmic masters, the trio Chemirani have branched out (both individually and as a group) inter-culturally.  They've recorded and performed with folk and classical music genii from around the world.  Although the Indian tabla have been long-known for  density/diversity of sound, Keyvan's Heartbeat of the Orient album features tracks demonstrating the comparability of the Persian tombac to the Indian tabla.

Works
Windhorse Riders (Djamchid's project with David Hykes - diaphonic singer)) (1989)
LET THE LOVER BE, David Hykes with Persian zarb master Djamchid Chemirani; label: Auvidis (1991)
Vocal Calligraphy: the Art of Classical Persian Song. (vocals by: Alireza Ghorbani)
Zarb Duo et Solo (Keyvan) (1997)
Vents d'Est. Ballade pour une mer qui chante (Keyvan). Vol 1 (1997)
Trio de Zarb (Bijan, Djamchid, and Keyvan) (1999)
Alazar (Keyvan Chemirani, Montanaro, Rizzo) (2000)
Gulistan (Bijan's album with Ross Daly, multi-instrumentalist) (2001)
Qalam Kar (The entire trio) (2002)
Eos (Bijan's project) (2002)
Falak (Keyvan's album with Neba Solo - African belefon player)) (2003)
Messatge. Keyvan Chemirani, Caro Rizzo, Saaba, Konomba Traore...Montanaro (1997) Album Daqui ( 2003)
Le Rhythme de la Parole I (Keyvan) (2004)
Kismet (Bijan's album with Stelios Petrakis on Buda Musique records) (2004)
Urna: Amilal (Keyvan and Djamchid with Mongolian singer "Urna") (2005)
Ross Daly: Microkosmos (supported by Chemirani) (2005)
Le Rhythme de la Parole II (The Rhythm of Speech Vol. 2 - features all three Chemirani with Iranian, African, and Indian accompaniment) (2006)
Battements Au Cœur De l'Orient (Heartbeat of the Orient - Keyvan's project with Anindo Chatterjee, tabla; also includes Maryam Chemirani as vocalist) (2007)
Invite (lineup: Djamchid Chemirani, zarb, vocal; Keyvan Chemirani, percussions; Bijan Chemirani, percussions; Ballaké Sissoko, kora; Omar Sosa, piano; Renaud Garcia-Fons, bass; Ross Daly, lyra, rebab; Sylvain Luc, acoustic guitar; Titi Robin, bouzouki) (2011)

See also
Hamavayan Ensemble
Aref ensemble
Dastan ensemble
Kamkar ensemble
Mastan Ensemble

References

External links
http://www.accords-croises.com/en/accueil.php
https://web.archive.org/web/20080812050700/http://www.mondomix.com/
Amazon Review Of Heartbeat of the Orient

Persian classical music groups
Buda Musique artists